Henry Heller (1841 – December 14, 1895) was a Union Army sergeant during the American Civil War and a recipient of America's highest military decoration—the Medal of Honor—for his actions at the Battle of Chancellorsville in Virginia in May 1863.

Medal of Honor citation
Rank and organization: Sergeant, Company A, 66th Ohio Infantry.
Place and date: At Chancellorsville, Va., May 2, 1863.
Entered service at: Urbana, Ohio.
Birth: Unknown.
Date of issue: July 29, 1892.

Citation: 
One of a party of 4 who, under heavy fire, voluntarily brought into the Union lines a wounded Confederate officer from whom was obtained valuable information concerning the position of the enemy.

See also
List of American Civil War Medal of Honor recipients: G–L

References

External links

1841 births
1895 deaths
United States Army Medal of Honor recipients
Union Army soldiers
People of Ohio in the American Civil War
People from Champaign County, Ohio
American Civil War recipients of the Medal of Honor